The Lycée Fénelon is an academic institution located in the 6th arrondissement of Paris, in the Latin Quarter. It receives its name from François Fénelon, a French theologian and writer (1651-1715) who promoted women's education in his writings, notably in his "Traité de l'éducation des filles".

The school was founded in 1892, in a building dating from the 17th century. It was initially created as the first high school for girls in Paris, to prepare female students to the École normale supérieure de jeunes filles. It later became coed in 1973 for CPGE classes, and in 1979 for high schoolers.

Like other lycées in France, Fénelon functions as an ordinary high school for years 10–12, but also as an institute to teach the “” (≈undergraduate) academic programs known as Classe préparatoire aux grandes écoles (a.k.a. CPGE, or prépas). Fénelon is in fact regarded as one of France's most prestigious and most competitive institutions in this domain. In particular, its Humanities (khâgne) students rank just behind Lycées Henri IV and Louis-Le-Grand in their rates of success in the annual entrance competition to ENS (“Concours”).

History
In the 18th century, the building that now houses the lycée was a luxury mansion, the Hôtel de Villayer, where Enlightenment scientists met. Its last owner sold it to the State in 1883, which made it the first high school for young girls in Paris. While most of the new boys 'high schools of the time were built from scratch, giving rise to buildings with a monumental style, the girls' high schools, like the Lycée Fénelon, often reinvested in old buildings. Moreover, the location of this first female high school in the capital is not insignificant, near the Latin Quarter, where the historic high schools of Paris are concentrated.

Initially, the Lycée Fénelon prepared girls to enter the École normale supérieure de jeunes filles located in Sèvres until 1940, and which merged with that of the rue d'Ulm (originally for boys) in 1985.

The Société des Agrégées was founded there in 1920. A professor at Fénelon, Élisabeth Butiaux became its first president.

Notable alumni
 Louise Bourgeois
 Nathalie Sarraute
 Olivier Py
 Dominique Aury
 Simone Weil
 Maryse Condé
 Assia Djebar
 Charlotte Casiraghi
 Jonathan Littell
 Maxence Caron
 Simone de Beauvoir 
 Louis Garrel
 Chiara Mastroianni
 Melvil Poupaud
 Louise Bourgeois
 Ginette Mathiot
 Denise Bonal
 Juliette Benzoni
 Hélène Solomon-Langevin 
 Geneviève Pastre 
 Françoise Héritier 
 Francesca Yvonne Caroutch 
 Michèle Battut 
 Philippe Marland 
 Nicolas Hulot
 Caroline of Monaco 
 Denis Podalydès
 Hakim Karoui 
 Jul 
 Gisèle Vienne 
 Katell Quillévéré 
 Leïla Slimani 
 Christine and the Queens

Buildings 
The teachers room is registered as a French Monument historique.

References

External links

 Official website
 Website of the alumni

Fenelon
Educational institutions established in 1892
Latin Quarter, Paris
1892 establishments in France